Sardar Kandy (also Romanized as Sardār Kandy; also known as Besheshai, Besh Shāy, Bīshak, and Byshechay) is a village in Ozomdel-e Jonubi Rural District, in the Central District of Varzaqan County, East Azerbaijan Province, Iran. At the 2006 census, its population was 29, in 7 families.

References 

Towns and villages in Varzaqan County